The 1909 Liège–Bastogne–Liège was the fifth edition of the Liège–Bastogne–Liège cycle race and was held on 16 May 1909. The race started and finished in Liège. The race was won by Victor Fastre.

General classification

References

1909
1909 in Belgian sport